Flavio Marazzi (born 7 February 1978 in Bern) is a Swiss sailor. He has participated in four Olympics from 2000 to 2012 competing in the Star class keelboat, finishing fourth in the 2008 edition together with Enrico De Maria. Flavio Marazzi now sails on a GC32 Catamaran in the team BLACK STAR. 

He is the brother of Renato Marazzi.

References

External links
 
 
 

1978 births
Living people
Swiss male sailors (sport)
Sportspeople from Bern
Olympic sailors of Switzerland
Sailors at the 2000 Summer Olympics – Star
Sailors at the 2004 Summer Olympics – Star
Sailors at the 2008 Summer Olympics – Star
Sailors at the 2012 Summer Olympics – Star
Star class sailors
5.5 Metre class sailors
World Champions in 5.5 Metre
World champions in sailing for Switzerland
21st-century Swiss people